James Deane (born 14 October 1991) is an Irish professional drift driver. He is a former 3 time Formula D champion, having won the series in 2017, 2018 and 2019 and has won multiple National and European titles.

Career
Deane began his career in competition drifting in 2006, driving a Ford Sierra in the Prodrift Junior Championship, finishing third in the series. In 2007, Deane won his first ever professional event in the main Prodrift series at Rosegreen at the age of fifteen, which is believed to have made him the youngest professional drift event winner in the world at the time. The following season, he won both the Irish series and the Prodrift European series, qualifying him to compete in the Red Bull Drifting World Championship in Long Beach, California.

Deane won the 2010 Prodrift series whilst also competing in some Formula D events. The following season, he won the Drift Allstars series for the Low Brain Drifters team, with six podiums including four wins. He won the Irish Drift Championship in 2013 and 2015 and from 2014 onwards, won the Drift Allstars European Series for three consecutive years.

In October 2016, following his third DA title, it was announced that Deane would return to Formula D for a full campaign in 2017. Deane would pilot a Toyota 2JZ powered Nissan Silvia S15 for the Worthouse drift team alongside teammate Piotr Wiecek. Wiecek would pilot an identical S15 converted to left hand drive. His return to competition in the United States was a major success, with him winning the 2017 Formula Drift Championship.

James returned to Formula Drift in 2018 alongside Worthouse. He finished the season in 1st Place, successfully defending his title. This would make him the second driver in Formula Drift history to win back-to-back championships, the first being Tanner "The Golden Child" Foust.

Deane took first place on the podium at the 2019 Oman Oil Marketing International Drift Championship. Representing Worthouse and Falken, Deane dominated the bracket despite an issue he was having due to a flaw with the rack and pinion in his steering assembly. This win at the Oman Drift Championship gives Deane his thirteenth title win.

Having successfully defended his Formula Drift Championship title, James Deane returned for the 2019 season, which would prove to be Deane's toughest Formula D season since his return to the series in 2017. On 19 October 2019 Deane was crowned 2019 Formula Drift Champion for the 3rd year in a row, making him the first driver in the sport's history to pull off a 3-peat. Deane is tied with Chris Forsberg for most Formula Drift championship titles; However Forsberg's championships were nonconsecutive, giving reason for many to hail James "The Machine" Deane as the best drifter on the planet.

As a result of the COVID-19 Pandemic, the Worthouse Drift Team withdrew from the 2020 Formula Drift championship. In the same statement, it was also announced that James Deane will no longer be competing with Worthouse.

On 3 March 2021, Deane announced that he would be competing in the 2021 Russian Drift Series with the AIMOL Drift Team. He would compete alongside teammates Daigo Saito and Charles NG.

On 23 February 2023 Vaughn Gittin Jr. announced that Deane would be competing in Formula D 2023 as a member of the RTR racing team.

World record
On 14 December 2014, Deane and Jordanian drifter Ahmad Daham set a new Guinness World Record for the world's longest tandem drift, 28.52 kilometres.

Story of starting number 130
Popular actor from Los Angeles James Dean loved racing and his Porsche "Little bastard", on which he died in a car accident, had number 130 on board. James Deane hoped that he could make number 130 more successful.

Personal life
Deane is in a relationship with Becky Evans, an automotive presenter and YouTuber who stars in the Red Bull series 'Drift Queen'.

References

1991 births
Living people
Drifting drivers
Formula D drivers
Irish racing drivers
Guinness World Records